The Gulf of Gonâve is a large gulf of the Caribbean Sea along the western coast of Haiti. Haiti's capital city, Port-au-Prince, is located on the coast of the gulf. Other cities on the gulf coast include Gonaïves, Saint-Marc, Léogane Miragoâne, and Jérémie. Several islands are located in the gulf, the largest being Gonâve Island, followed by the much smaller Cayemites.

The Golfe is more than 500 km in length from Mole-Saint-Nicolas to Abricots and it consist of more than a dozen bays and harbors. The bay of Port-au-Prince is the largest in the country and one of the biggest in the Caribbean.

References

 
Bodies of water of Haiti
Gulfs of the Caribbean Sea